The Governor's Office of Business and Economic Development (GO-Biz) was created by Governor Edmund G. Brown Jr. in 2012. GO-Biz serves as the State of California's leader for job growth and economic development efforts. GO-Biz offers a range of services to business owners, including attraction, retention and expansion services, site selection, permit streamlining, clearing of regulatory hurdles, small business assistance, international trade development, assistance with state government, and more.

As part of the governor's 2012 budget, the elements of economic development under GO-Biz were realigned to put a stronger emphasis on job creation and promoting California as a place to do business.

Innovation and Entrepreneurship 
The Innovation and Entrepreneurship Department was created by GO-Biz to facilitate and promote innovation in the state of California. This department accomplishes their goals and visions through the Innovation Hub Program which is known as "the largest innovation network in the country". Currently, there are 15  located throughout California, such as in San Francisco, Fresno and Los Angeles.  primary goal is to ensure that California is a place where ideas can be transformed into innovations and successful businesses in the market force. This in turn promotes job creation, boosts long-term economic activity and attracts entrepreneurship in various economic sectors such as medical technology, information technology, agriculture and life sciences.

In efforts to promote entrepreneurship, innovation and job creation, GO-Biz has partnered with California's higher education system such as the University of California. Events are held on many UC campuses where speakers have the opportunity to speak about topics of their choice as it pertains to business and innovation. Members of the events include but are not limited to "venture capitalists, students, faculty, and local businesses". Having a platform where like-minded individuals can discuss and explore creative ideas "expands its potential to produce innovation that leads to new business growth".

References 

Government of California